Tallinn Cathedral may refer to:

 St. Mary's Cathedral, Tallinn, (also known as "Dome Church"), Estonian Evangelical Lutheran
 Alexander Nevsky Cathedral, Tallinn, Estonian Orthodox Church of the Moscow Patriarchate
 St. Peter and St. Paul's Cathedral, Tallinn, Roman Catholic
 St. Simeon's and St. Anne's Cathedral Church, Tallinn, Estonian Apostolic Orthodox Church

See also 
 List of cathedrals in Estonia